In probability theory and statistics, the factorial moment generating function (FMGF) of the probability distribution of a real-valued random variable X is defined as 

for all complex numbers t for which this expected value exists. This is the case at least for all t on the unit circle , see characteristic function.

The factorial moment generating function generates the factorial moments of the probability distribution.
Provided  exists in a neighbourhood of t = 1, the nth factorial moment is given by 

where the Pochhammer symbol (x)n is the falling factorial

(Many mathematicians, especially in the field of special functions, use the same notation to represent the rising factorial.)

Examples

Poisson distribution
Suppose X has a Poisson distribution with expected value λ, then its factorial moment generating function is

(use the definition of the exponential function) and thus we have

See also
 Moment (mathematics)
 Moment-generating function
 Cumulant-generating function

References

Factorial and binomial topics
Moment (mathematics)
Generating functions